Raushaan Glasgow (born June 4, 1991), better known by his stage name LSDXOXO, is a Berlin-based musician born in Philadelphia who made a name for himself in New York City as a DJ and producer. Glasgow is well-known for his energetic DJ sets, of which manipulate mainstream sounds by craftily layering pop tracks and vocal samples between Baltimore club, ghetto house, hardcore, electro and techno.

Career

Early years (2010–2012)

Glasgow began making homemade dance edits of pop and hip hop hits during his freshman year of high school. He briefly went by Funky$punk in mid-2010, later adopting the LSDXOXO moniker because "it sounded like an AIM username, […] was super troll-y, and that’s just how [he] approached music as an artist".

In 2010, Glasgow began self-releasing his Spit or Swallow series of mixtapes on Tumblr, which were complied of mashups of popular songs from artists such as Rihanna, Crystal Castles, M.I.A., Lady Gaga, and La Roux. The seven mixtapes have been described as dreamy, hazy, and hallucinogenic, though Glasgow has since described the production as "really crunchy and bad".

SOFTCORE, WHORECORE, and breakthrough (2013–2020)
In 2013, Glasgow began collaborating with other artists, lending his signature sound to now-established acts like Big Momma and BbyMutha. One of Glasgow's more well-known works is the song "Truth Tella" which features Cakes da Killa rapping over a chopped and screwed sample of "Lavender Town" from a Pokémon game. The song was included in the tracklist of his debut extended play SOFTCORE, which featured several different artists such as Le1f, Cakes da Killa, UNiiQU3, and DonChristian. Glasgow's follow-up extended play WHORECORE was released on July 2, 2014 and some of the collaborators from SOFTCORE returned as featured artists on the EP.

After gaining a sizable following through his releases and graduating from college with a degree in Business Management, Glasgow found himself based in New York. He began performing in NYC at events like Joey LaBeija’s "Legendary" parties in Williamsburg, Brooklyn and was welcomed into the GHE20G0TH1K collective. Having been touring heavily in Europe, Glasgow moved to Berlin, Germany.

Dedicated 2 Disrespect and upcoming debut album (2021–present)
In May 2021, Glasgow released his highly anticipated third EP Dedicated 2 Disrespect through XL Recordings, containing four tracks that presented his own songwriting and vocals rather than music samples as his previous works had featured. The lead single off of the EP, "Sick Bitch", received critical acclaim and has been played in several DJ sets since its release. Later in the year, Glasgow also remixed Lady Gaga's "Alice" for her third remix album Dawn of Chromatica, serving as the album's opening track.

Production of Glasgow's debut studio album was announced in 2022, said to feature debut single "DRaiN", released April 26, 2022. In June 2022, Glasgow collaborated with fellow Pennsylvanian musician Eartheater on the single "Demons", another possible track on Glasgow's upcoming album. On February 10, 2023, American singer Kelela released her second studio album Raven, which featured five songs produced by Glasgow. He had previously remixed her song "Truth or Dare" in 2018, which appeared on her remix album Take Me a_Part, the Remixes.

Personal life
Born in Philadelphia, Glasgow is of African American and Caribbean Hispanic descent. He is gay.

Discography

Extended plays

Mixtapes

Compilations

Non-album singles
 "Creepy Clown Sighting (A Warning)" (2017)
 "Aquecimento Do Evanescence" (2017)
 "I Still Loathe You" (2018)
 "Inertia" (2019)
 "Rockstar69" (2019)
 "Women Eat Their Men" (2020)
 "Dying for It" (2021)
 "uwu" (2021)

Other charted songs

Guest appearances

See also
 LGBT culture in New York City
 List of LGBT people from New York City

References

American gay musicians
LGBT African Americans
LGBT people from Pennsylvania
LGBT rappers
Living people
Rappers from Pennsylvania
Year of birth missing (living people)
21st-century American musicians
People from Philadelphia
21st-century LGBT people
21st-century African-American musicians